Mary Anne Salmon (born April 9, 1939) is an American politician who served in the Arkansas House of Representatives from the 61st district from 1999 to 2003 and in the Arkansas Senate from the 31st district from 2003 to 2013.

References

1939 births
Living people
Democratic Party members of the Arkansas House of Representatives
Democratic Party Arkansas state senators